Marco Cattaneo may refer to:
Marco Cattaneo (cyclist, born 1957), Italian cyclist
Marco Cattaneo (cyclist, born 1982), Italian cyclist
Marco Cattaneo (cross-country skier) (born 1974), Italian cross-country skier, American Birkebeiner winner